William Hamilton and Company was a British shipyard in Port Glasgow, Scotland. The company was bought by Lithgow Ltd., which later became Scott Lithgow and was nationalised as part of British Shipbuilders in 1977.

During the Second World War the company built several vessels for the Royal Navy, including s.

Hamiltons built the Pacific Star for the Booth Steamship Company Ltd, which was leased to the Blue Star Line as Blue Star's only tanker.

Ships built by William Hamilton Co Ltd

William Hamilton also built a floating dock for Surabaya in 1912.

Notes and references

External links
 

1867 establishments in Scotland
Defunct shipbuilding companies of Scotland
Former defence companies of the United Kingdom